Continuum is an album by bassist Ray Drummond which was recorded in 1994 and released on the Arabesque label.

Reception

The AllMusic review by Scott Yanow said "Alternating some blues-oriented numbers with more complex pieces, Drummond put together a varied program that brings out the best in his illustrious sidemen".

Track listing
All compositions by Ray Drummond except where noted
 "A Blues from the Sketchpad" – 7:25
 "Equipoise" (Stanley Cowell) – 6:51
 "The Intimacy of the Blues" (Billy Strayhorn) – 5:00
 "Gloria's Step" (Scott LaFaro) – 11:51
 "Some Serious Steppin'" – 8:23
 "Sakura" (Traditional) – 5:42
 "Sail Away" (Tom Harrell) – 7:55
 "Blues in the Closet" (Oscar Pettiford) – 7:04
 "Sophisticated Lady" (Duke Ellington, Mitchell Parish, Irving Mills) – 6:29

Personnel
Ray Drummond – double bass
John Scofield – guitar
Randy Brecker – trumpet
Kenny Barron – piano
Marvin "Smitty" Smith – drums, percussion
Thomas Chapin – flute, alto flute, bass flute
Steve Nelson – vibraphone
Mor Thiam – percussion

References

Arabesque Records albums
Ray Drummond albums
1994 albums